Black Thunder is a 1998 action film directed by Rick Jacobson and starring Michael Dudikoff and Richard Norton. The story follows Vince (Michael Dudikoff) and Jannick (Gary Hudson) as they are sent to retrieve a newly-developed American stealth plane stolen by Libyan terrorists.

Cast
 Michael Dudikoff as Vince Conners
 Richard Norton as Rather
 Marcus Aurelius as Hinkle
 Catherine Bell as Lisa
 Michael Cavanaugh as General Barnes
 Frederic Forrest as The Admiral
 John Furey as Moore
 Landon Hall as Eileen
 Gary Hudson as Jannick
 John Lafayette as Demuth
 Robert Madrid as Stone
 Robert Miranda as Rojar
 Dean Scofield as Captain Jones
 Sonny Surowiec as Alias
 Marc Vahanian as Radio Operator
 Nancy Valen as Mela
 John Patrick White as Winston

References

External links

1998 films
American aviation films
1998 action films
American action films
Techno-thriller films
1990s English-language films
Films directed by Rick Jacobson
1990s American films